Stevens Stadium is a 7,000-seat soccer stadium on the west coast of the United States, located on the campus of Santa Clara University in Santa Clara, California. The stadium is the current home of the Santa Clara Broncos soccer teams and was the former home of the now-defunct football team as well as the baseball team. The baseball team moved to their new home at Stephen Schott Stadium in 2005.

The former home of the San Jose Earthquakes of Major League Soccer, the stadium's capacity was increased in the winter of 2007 from a capacity of 6,800 to 10,300. It was named Buck Shaw Stadium up until a renovation was done in 2015.

Stadium history
Buck Shaw Stadium opened its gates for the first time on September 22, 1962 when it hosted a football game between UC Davis and Santa Clara. Named for Lawrence T. "Buck" Shaw, a former football coach of the SCU Broncos, the playing surface still retains his name to the present day, being named Buck Shaw Field. The stadium was used for football games until 1992 and baseball games until 2005.

In 2005, the venue was converted from a multipurpose facility to a soccer-only facility when the dugouts, baseball infield, and baseball backstop were permanently removed.  The name was changed to Stevens Stadium following a renovation project in 2015. 

The stadium is the current location of the commencement ceremonies for the university.  The site was first used for the undergraduate commencement on Saturday, June 9, 2001.

San Jose Earthquakes
On October 26, 2007, the San Jose Earthquakes of Major League Soccer announced that they would play a majority of their home games during the 2008 season at the stadium.  Upgrades such as additional seating and bathrooms were added to the stadium in order for it to comply with MLS standards and funded by the Earthquakes organization over the last part 2008. The capacity was increased from 6,800 seats to 10,300 seats. In addition, the field was moved closer to the existing grandstand, with a small section removed from section 107 to accommodate the shift. The Santa Clara practice field between the Leavey Center and Stevens was replaced with an "Italgrass" artificial turf surface.

Drainage improvements were also made to the stadium's field in concert with the field crown being removed to produce a flat pitch. A new video scoreboard was added along with additional concession and merchandising stands. General facilities were also modernized or improved including the addition of new lighting, a TV press box, new sound system, and an additional grandstand on the stadium's west side. The new grandstand included all of the seating additions made to the stadium. About half of the new grandstand included tip up seating. Overall, the enhancements cost around $4 million.

After the Earthquakes departed for their new Avaya Stadium, the university undertook an improvement project that removed the original east side press box from the stadium as well as the Earthquakes temporary bleachers on the west side of the stadium. In their place a new smaller permanent west side grandstand, press box and entry plaza were installed. Capacity of the stadium was reduced back to 7,000 permanent seats as a result.

Other sports events

Soccer
In summer of 1981 the stadium was the main venue for the World Games 1981.

During the 1994 FIFA World Cup, the stadium was the official practice field of the Brazil soccer team. The Brazilians won the World Cup that year. It also played host to the Romanian national team for their practice prior to that year's quarterfinal match.

Stevens Stadium holds the current record for highest attendance at a women's outdoor collegiate sporting event. In 1996 the NCAA Women's College Cup (Division I soccer finals) was played at Buck Shaw, which had its capacity temporarily expanded to 8,800 seats and sold out both days of the tournament.

In 2009, the stadium also hosted FC Gold Pride, one of the seven charter teams of Women's Professional Soccer. However, Gold Pride moved to Pioneer Stadium in Hayward for the 2010 season.

Rugby
The stadium has also hosted several international rugby matches. In 2006, Buck Shaw hosted three pool matches in the Churchill Cup rugby union competition, becoming the first U.S. venue to host matches in that tournament (all matches in the 2003–2005 editions had been in Canada). In May 2009 the stadium again hosted an international rugby match, with 10,000 fans turning out to watch the game between the United States and Ireland.

International matches

References

External links 

 Official Santa Clara University Site

Sports venues in Santa Clara County, California
Defunct college football venues
Santa Clara Broncos baseball
Santa Clara Broncos football
Santa Clara Broncos soccer
Santa Clara University buildings and structures
Rugby union stadiums in California
American football venues in California
Baseball venues in California
Soccer venues in California
Sports in Santa Clara, California
FC Gold Pride
San Jose Earthquakes
Women's Professional Soccer stadiums
Former Major League Soccer stadiums
Sports venues in the San Francisco Bay Area
Buildings and structures in Santa Clara, California
1962 establishments in California
Sports venues completed in 1962